Karunya Ram is an Indian actress who works in Kannada-language cinema. She is known for performing in the 2015 film Vajrakaya.

Filmography

Television shows

Awards

References

External links
 

Living people
Year of birth missing (living people)
Indian film actresses
Actresses in Kannada cinema
Actresses in Tamil cinema
21st-century Indian actresses
Bigg Boss Kannada contestants